ARRC may stand for:
 Advanced Radar Research Center, University of Oklahoma, Oklahoma, USA
 Allied Rapid Reaction Corps, based in Gloucestershire, England
 Associate Royal Red Cross, a UK military nursing decoration
 Advanced Rocket Research Center, NCTU, Taiwan
 Advanced Institute for Research on Religion and Culture, Hyderabad, India
 Africa Rainforest and River Conservation, a US based NGO that focused on Equatorial African rainforest conservation.
 Asia Road Racing Championship, a motorcycle championship in Asia